Curio repens, syn. Senecio serpens, is a species of the genus Curio in the Asteraceae family. A succulent endemic to the Western Cape province of South Africa, it is typically found growing from crevices in rocky sandstone slopes. Commonly named blue chalksticks, it is used as an ornamental plant.

Description
It is a semi-trailing, low-growing dwarf shrub that forms a dense mat that reaches only about 20 cm in height and features silvery-blueish, finger-like fleshy leaves. It produces small and round, pompom-like flowers that may superficially resemble a virus. The flowers appear as off-white from distance, but would have yellow and pink tinges on the stamen up-close. Flowering season is usually between spring and autumn. It was first formally described as Cacalia repens by Carl Linnaeus in 1767.

It should be distinguished from Curio talinoides by its shorter, broader and often boat-shaped leaves.

Cultivation
Drought tolerant, the plant is used as a ground cover, border plant or in a rock garden. It is grown in sandy, dry to slightly moist soils in sun or some partial shade. It is easily propagated by cuttings.

There is a hybrid of this and Curio talinoides that is known as 'Trident Blue'.

Gallery

References

repens
Flora of Southern Africa
Garden plants of Southern Africa
Drought-tolerant plants